The Cașin is a right tributary of the river Trotuș in Romania. It discharges into the Trotuș in Onești.

Tributaries

The following rivers are tributaries to the river Cașin (from source to mouth):

Left: Dobrii, Bucieș, Curița
Right: Zboina, Marmora, Haloșul Mic, Haloșul Mare, Haloșul Ciubotaru, Buciumi

References

Rivers of Romania
Rivers of Bacău County